Pauline "Polly" Tompkins (March 5, 1918 – November 19, 2004) was the first female president of Cedar Crest College in Allentown, Pennsylvania, in the United States.

Early life and education
Tompkins was born in Rhinelander, Wisconsin. She graduated from Pine Manor College in 1938 and Mount Holyoke College in 1941 with Phi Beta Kappa honors. She received her Ph.D. from Tufts University in 1948.

Career
Tompkins was general director of the American Association of University Women from 1959 to 1967. She was appointed by President Lyndon B. Johnson to the nine-member United States Advisory Commission on International Education and Cultural Affairs in 1964. She was chairman of the board of the Carnegie Foundation for the Advancement of Teaching from 1974 to 1976.

Tompkins died in 2004 in Edgecomb, Maine, aged 86 years.

Published works

References

External links
Cedar Crest College Biography

1918 births
2004 deaths
Cedar Crest College faculty
Pine Manor College alumni
The Fletcher School at Tufts University alumni
Heads of universities and colleges in the United States
Mount Holyoke College alumni
People from Rhinelander, Wisconsin
20th-century American academics